is a Japanese manga by Koge-Donbo. It was serialized in the shōnen manga magazine Dengeki Comic Gao! between the October 1999 and August 2003 issues and was later collected into eight tankōbon volumes. The eight volumes were localized for North America by Tokyopop; Madman Entertainment used Tokyopop's translations for distribution in Australasia. The plot follows Kotarou Higuchi who becomes acquainted with the angel Misha, and the demon Shia.

Pita-Ten has spun off an anthology manga, art books, a light novel series, and an anime; the anime resulted in a radio program and audio disc releases such as soundtracks and image songs. Tokyopop's volumes of Pita-Ten ranked on ICv2's monthly top one-hundred selling graphic novels. English reviewers praised the plot and artwork, generally describing the series as cute.

Plot
Kotarou Higuchi is befriended by his neighbor Misha, an angel-in-training. He is later acquainted with Shia, a demon, who is urged by her forgotten memories to search for something. Kotarou continues his daily life until Shia absorbs his life energy and leaves town. Kotarou investigates and discovers Shia is his great-grandmother who is searching for his dying great-grandfather, Taro Higuchi. After the revelation, Shia regains her memories and mourns Taro's death before she also dies. Afterwards, Kotarou learns that Misha's test involves helping Kotarou find happiness; regardless of the result, the two will separate when the test's deadline is reached. Realizing Heaven's true intent, Kotarou asks Misha to rid him of his ability to see angels as he has to search for happiness himself; Misha passes the test and becomes the angel. The series ends with the two returning to their separate lives.

Characters

The heroine. Misha is an angel who was friends with Kotaroh. After Kotaroh's suicide, Heaven imprisons Misha and strips her of her status because she was an indirect cause of his death. In the present, Heaven frees Misha and gives her a chance to redeem herself by having Kotarou as her test. In the anime, Kotarou is not related to Misha's test and are neighbors by coincidence; she was voiced by Yukari Tamura. In 2002, Misha appeared in Newtypes poll in the favorite female character category.

The protagonist. Kotarou is a sixth grade elementary school student at Misaki Seiei Private Academy. At a very young age he lost his mother after she saved him from a speeding truck. Because of this and his father's work, Kotarou is alone most of the time resulting in his stoic and independent personality. Kotarou is able to see angels, demons, and spirits because he is a descendant of Shia. Kotaroh's family were labeled as demons by the villager. Since Misha was Kotaroh's emotional support, he committed suicide when Misha was forced to return to heaven. Kotarou was initially in love with Shia which strains his friendship with Takashi. Eventually, his feelings shift towards Misha and is reinforced when Shia is revealed to be his great-grandmother. In the anime adaptation, Kotarou's relation to Kotaroh and Shia was removed; he was voiced by Miyuki Sawashiro.

Shia is a demon with the appearance of a frail feminine girl. Because of her nature, she needs to absorb life energy while in the human world to survive. She married  and gave birth to Kotarou's granduncle and grandmother. Due to her demonic nature, Shia was forced to return to hell to restore her health; her demon memories overwrite her memories as Shima. Due to Taro's ailing health, Shia returns to the human world and subconsciously searches for him. She regains her memories as Shima when Kotarou reveals her past to her, and attends Taro's funeral; ignoring her demonic nature to feed, Shia dies shortly after. In the anime, Shia has no relation to the Higuchi family and travels to the human world to complete her demon apprenticeship. Shia's good nature causes her to fail and her existence is annulled; at the end of the series, Misha brings Shia back to life as a human. She was voiced by Yukana Nogami.

Takashi is Kotarou's friend and classmate. He secretly works hard to maintain his public image as a prodigy. He loves Koboshi but moves onto Shia when he learns Koboshi loves Kotarou. His family's financial difficulties forces him to abandon his dreams of enrolling in a high quality school. In the anime, Takashi's feelings and home life is never explored; he was voiced by Mitsuki Saiga.

Koboshi Uematsu is Kotarou's friend and classmate. She harbors a crush on him and confesses her feelings later in the series. After she is rejected, Koboshi changes her outlook on life and strives to improve herself to make Kotarou regret his decision. In the anime, her confession does not occur; she was voiced by Rie Kugimiya.

Other characters
 is Kotarou's classmate. He strives to better himself in order to become a dignified head of the Mitarai family. In the anime, Hiroshi's story remains the same, and he was voiced by Motoko Kumai.
 is Hiroshi's younger sister. She admires her brother and attacks anyone who insults him. She develops a crush on Takashi which prioritizes her admiration for her brother. In the anime, Kaoru's story remains the same and she was voiced by Sakura Nogawa.
 is a demon who accompanies Shia and encourages her to act like a demon. He disguises himself as a black cat in public. While in cat form, he is named  by Misha and is credited by that name in the manga and anime. Klaus is voiced by Yumi Touma.
 is Misha's older sister and an angel. She is strict, formal, and often berates Misha for her laid back personality. She was voiced by Akemi Okamura.
 is Kotarou's maternal cousin. Since her mother's death, Shino has been cared for by her and Kotarou's great-grandfather. Like Kotarou, she can see angels, demons and spirits. She moves in with Kotarou later in the series. In the anime, Shino's story remains the same, and she was voiced by Taeko Kawata.

Release
Pita-Ten is a manga series written and illustrated by Koge-Donbo. It was serialized in Dengeki Comic Gao! between the October 1999 and August 2003 issues. The individual chapters were then collected and released in eight tankōbon volumes under MediaWorks' Dengeki Comics imprint between April 10, 2000 and September 27, 2003. The manga was localized in English for North America by Tokyopop and released the eight volumes between January 13, 2004 and March 8, 2005. Tokyopop released a special boxset containing the first four volumes on November 10, 2005. In 2011, Tokyopop's North American division was closed down and their licenses to manga franchises were revoked. Madman Entertainment licensed Tokyopop's translations for distribution in Australasia. The series has also been localized in other languages such as French, German, and Mandrain.

An anthology series entitled  was published by MediaWorks between March 27 and September 27, 2002. The fan books were licensed and released in English by Tokyopop between November 8, 2005 and July 7, 2006.

Volume list

Adaptations

Books and publications
Three light novels, written by Yukari Ochiai, were published by MediaWorks under their Dengeki Bunko imprint between April 15, 2002 and February 25, 2003. Koge-Donbo provided the cover illustrations and Rina Yamaguchi drew the illustrations used in the novels. The novels were localized for North America by Seven Seas Entertainment, which released the first two volumes in March and July 2008.

An art book titled  was published MediaWorks on February 27, 2002. Two art books for the anime adaptation titled  were published by MediaWorks between August 25 and November 15, 2002. An art book titled  was published by MediaWorks on December 22, 2003. Tokyopop localized Koge-Donbo Illustration Collection: Pita-Ten on May 9, 2006.

Anime series

An anime based on the manga was produced by Television Osaka, Yomiko Advertising, Pita Group, and animated by Madhouse. The series premiered on TX Network between April 7 and September 29, 2002. It was also broadcast on Higashinippon Broadcasting, Hiroshima Home Television, Nagano Broadcasting Systems, Kumamoto Asahi Broadcasting, The Niigata Television Network 21, Ishikawa TV, Nara Television, Biwako Broadcasting, TV Wakayama, and Nankai Broadcasting. Bandai Visual collected the series into nine VHS and DVD mediums and released them between June 25, 2002 and April 25, 2003. A DVD box was released on December 22, 2011. The opening and ending themes had special editions singles with the anime's art on the cover. AnimeNation entered negotiations to localize the series for North America but withdrew due to licensing fees. In July 2015, Right Stuf Inc.'s Nozomi Entertainment announced an English subtitled release for North America.

Several soundtracks were released based on the anime.  volume 1 and 2 were released on July and October 2002 respectively.  is an image song released on January 22, 2003.

Radio programming
A radio programming titled  was produced to promote the anime adaptations for Pita-Ten and Galaxy Angel. It was produced by Bandai Visual, Broccoli, Lantis, and Madhouse and was broadcast on Radio Osaka, Nippon Cultural Broadcasting, and Tokai Radio. The show is hosted by Yukari Tamura, Misha's voice actress, and Ryōko Shintani, the voice actress of Galaxy Angels Milfeulle Sakuraba. Pita Pita Angel was broadcast beginning April 4, 2002. The broadcast concluded on March 27, 2003.

Reception
Tokyopop's localized volume four and up appeared on ICv2's monthly top one-hundred selling graphic novels. Mania.com's first impression of the manga was "cute, but not special" but retracted his opinion after Shia's introduction as she invoked fascination from the reviewer; the reviewer praised Shia's past for its direction and dark tone. Mania also praised the art, noting the transitions between scenes of "beautiful tenderness" and humor, and lauded the author for their detail in expressing emotions through facial expressions and body pose. AnimeFringe.com called the series fun and cute and expressed positive opinions on the culminating plot. The first three DVD volumes of the anime appeared on Oricon's charts. THEMAnime.org reviewed the anime; they criticized the premise for being excessively cute but noted the improving plot and praised the ending.

Notes and references
Notes

References

Primary references

External links

1999 manga
2002 anime television series debuts
2002 Japanese novels
Dengeki Bunko
Kadokawa Dwango franchises
Dengeki Comic Gao!
Fantasy anime and manga
Light novels
Madhouse (company)
Seven Seas Entertainment titles
Shōnen manga
Tokyopop titles